The ATKV-Prosaprys (AKTV Prose Prize) is a literary award awarded annually by the ATKV to an Afrikaans writer for a work of prose published during the previous calendar year. The prize was first awarded in 1984 to Dalene Matthee for her book Kringe in ’n bos.

Previous winners 
 2020 – Harry Kalmer for 
 2019 – Lodewyk G. du Plessis for 
 2018 – Etienne van Heerden for 
 2017 – Dan Sleigh for 1795
 2016 – Debbie Loots fir Split
 2015 – Francois Smith for Kamphoer
 2014 – Chris Karsten for  
 2013 – Karin Brynard for 
 2012 – Dan Sleigh for 
 2011 – Chris Karsten for 
 2010 – Eben Venter for Santa Gamka
 2009 – P.G. du Plessis for 
 2008 – Chris Karsten for Frats
 2007 – Marita van der Vyver for 
 2006 – Etienne van Heerden for 
 2005 – Etienne van Heerden for 
 2003 – Marzanne Leroux-Van der Boon for Granate bloei in Jerusalem (Lux Verbi BM)
 2000 – Berna Ackerman for 
 1996 – Dalene Matthee for Toorberg
 1994 – Etienne van Heerden for 
 1989 – Etienne van Heerden for Liegfabriek
 1987 – Dalene Matthee for Moerbeibos
 1987 – Etienne van Heerden for Moerbeibos
 1985 – Dalene Matthee for Fiela se kind
 1984 – Dalene Matthee for

References 

Afrikaans
South African literary awards